The Museum of the American Printing House for the Blind opened in 1994 and is located in Louisville, Kentucky. The museum tells the story of the international history of the education of people who are blind, and how the American Printing House for the Blind has contributed to that history. Exhibits focus on tactile systems, writing devices, braille production, orientation and mobility, educational aids and early schools for the blind. It is located on the second floor of the company's original 1883 factory building.

Exhibits 

Contrary to usual etiquette, nearly all exhibits are meant to be touched. A reader rail follows the entire museum with braille labels, audio devices, and tactile illustrations in front of each exhibit. Displays include original Talking Book recording and playback equipment, long canes and dog guide harness, original stereotype printing plates and equipment, a comprehensive collection of historic braillewriters, and many historic books printed in various tactile writing systems. These include An Essay on the Education of the Blind printed 1786 in the first raised letters for blind people; The Gospel According to St. Mark printed 1834 in raised Roman letters; John Bunyan's Pilgrim's Progress printed 1860 in Lucas Type; John Gay's Fables printed 1869 in Boston line letter; the 145-volume 1959 World Book Encyclopedia printed in braille, and Helen Keller's Bible. Visitors can write their names in braille, play accessible computer games, experiment with goggles simulating different visual impairments, and explore many other hands-on displays.

Open for self-guided visits most of every week, guided tours are also available of the museum and factory.

See also
List of attractions and events in the Louisville metropolitan area

External links
Museum of the American Printing House for the Blind

History of education in the United States
American Printing House for the Blind
American Printing House for the Blind
American Printing House for the Blind
American Printing House for the Blind
1994 establishments in Kentucky